The Marie R. Pistilli Women in Engineering Achievement Award is issued annually since 2000 by the Design Automation Conference (DAC) to honor the outstanding achievements of women in Electronic Design Automation. It is named after the co-founder of DAC, Marie Pistilli. Originally named as the "Marie R. Pistilli Women in EDA Achievement Award", it is named the "Marie R. Pistilli Women in Engineering Achievement Award" since 2016.

Recipients
2000: Penny Herscher, then with Cadence Design Systems
2001: Deirdre Hanford, Synopsys, Inc.
2002: Ann Rincon,  then senior technical staff member at IBM Microelectronics, Burlington, Vermont, "For her significant contributions in helping women advance in the field of DA technology"
2003: Karen Bartleson
2004: Mary Jane Irwin  
2005: Kathryn Kranen, Jasper Design Automation
2006: Ellen J. Yoffa
2007: Jan Willis, then with Cadence Design Systems - "Jan's leadership and dedication in serving as a mentor and role model to women in EDA, and young girls and boys as they begin to consider career options, exemplifies what the Marie R. Pistilli Women in Electronic Design Automation Achievement Award is all about."
2008: Louise Trevillyan
2009: Telle Whitney
2010: Mar Hershenson, Vice President of Product Development in the Custom Design Business Unit at Magma Design Automation
2011: Limor Fix, senior principal engineer and director of academic programs and research at Intel
2012: Belle Wei, then Dean of Engineering, San Jose State University
2013: Nanette Collins, a public relations consultant from Boston, active in EDA industry
2014: Diana Marculescu,  Professor of Electrical and Computer Engineering, Carnegie Mellon University
2015: Margaret Martonosi
2016: Soha Hassoun, Tufts University
2017: Janet Olson, then with Synopsys, Inc. 
2018: Anne Cirkel, Senior Director for Technology Marketing at Mentor, a Siemens Business
2019: R. Iris Bahar, Brown University
2020: Alessandra Nardi, Cadence Design Systems Software Engineering Group Director 
2021: Renu Mehra, Vice President Engineering, Synopsys, Inc.

See also
 List of engineering awards

References

Awards established in 2000
Electronic design automation people
Electronic engineering awards
Lists of award winners